Satelmish may refer to:
 Satelmish-e Mohammadabad
 Satelmish-e Mohammadlu
 Satelmish-e Tupkhaneh